Addicted To Music DVD is a DVD released by the German producer and remixer, ATB, in 2003, the same year he released the Addicted to Music album.

It includes all of the videos from 1998 to 2003 (except "Long Way Home"), a US tour documentary, interviews, lyrics, photo gallery and the making of "I Don't Wanna Stop".

Track listings

The Videos (Dolby Digital 5.1) 
 9 PM (Till I Come)
 Don't Stop!
 Killer
 The Summer
 The Fields of Love
 Let U Go
 Hold You
 You're Not Alone
 I Don't Wanna Stop

US Tour
US Tour Documentary

Inside
ATB Studios
Electronic Press Kit
Interview

History
Discography with lyrics
Timeline
Gallery

Specials
ATB-Quiz
Making of "I Don't Wanna Stop"

Bonus
Special DVD-ROM Part (With Wallpapers)

ATB video albums
2003 video albums
Music video compilation albums
2003 compilation albums